The 2013 Segunda División, was the 68th edition of the second tier of Federación Peruana de Futbol. The season was played on a home-and-away round-robin basis.

The clubs Cobresol and Coronel Bolognesi withdrew before the start of the season and was relegated to the Copa Perú for outstanding debts with the SAFAP.

The clubs Sport Áncash and Alianza Cristiana were disabled and relegated to the Copa Perú for outstanding debts with the SAFAP.

Teams

League table

Results

Top goalscorers 
13 goals
 Jesús Reyes (Alianza Universidad)
12 goals
 Juan Pablo Vergara (Alfonso Ugarte)
10 goals
 Janio Posito (Los Caimanes)
9 goals
 Luis Laguna (Sport Victoria)
 César Flores (Torino)
 Alexander Salas (Alianza Universidad)
 Smith (Alianza Universidad)

References

External links
 RSSSF
 Segunda División news and statistics at Dechalaca.com 

2
2013
2013 in South American second tier football leagues